The 1983–84 Liga Bet season saw Maccabi Tamra, Maccabi Or Akiva, Maccabi HaShikma Ramat Gan and Hapoel Dimona win their regional divisions and promoted to Liga Alef.

At the bottom, Hapoel Ein Mahil, Hapoel Safed (from North A division), Hapoel HaTzair Kiryat Haim (from North B division), Hapoel Rosh HaAyin, Hapoel Tel Mond (from South A division), Maccabi Be'er Sheva and Maccabi Ashkelon (from South B division) were all automatically relegated to Liga Gimel, whilst Hapoel Afula (from North B division) folded during the season.

North Division A

North Division B

Hapoel Afula folded during the season.

South Division A

South Division B

References
HaShikma, Dimona and Or Akiva to Liga Alef (Page 8) Hadshot HaSport, 13.5.84, archive.football.co.il 
The Police prevented Liga Bet matches in Tamra and Acre (Page 3) Hadshot HaSport, 20.5.84, archive.football.co.il 
Congratulations, Maccabi Tamra (Page 8) Hadshot HaSport, 17.6.84, archive.football.co.il 
Maccabi HaShikma promoted to Liga Alef from the South (Page 8) Hadshot HaSport, 6.5.84, archive.football.co.il 

Liga Bet seasons
Israel
4